Union Basket Sport Club Graz, commonly known as UBSC Graz, is a professional basketball club based in Graz, Austria that plays in the Austrian Basketball Bundesliga (German: Österreichische Basketball Bundesliga, ÖBL). Due to sponsorship reasons, the team was previously also  known as UBSC Raiffeisen Graz. The home arena of the team is the Raiffeisen Sportpark Graz, an indoor sporting arena with a capacity of approximately 3,000 spectators.
The team colors are blue and yellow.

Current roster

Season by season

Notable players
- Set a club record or won an individual award as a professional player.
- Played at least one official international match for his senior national team at any time.
  Stanley Whittaker

References

External links
Eurobasket.com UBSC Graz Page
Official website 

Basketball teams in Austria
Organisations based in Graz
Sport in Graz
Austrian Basketball Superliga teams
Basketball teams established in 1977